This was the first edition of the tournament.

Wang Xinyu and You Xiaodi won the title, defeating Hsieh Shu-ying and Lu Jingjing in the final, 6–3, 6–7(5–7), [10–2].

Seeds

Draw

Draw

References
Main Draw

Jinan International Open - Doubles